The Guardians of the Galaxy is a fictional superhero team appearing in American comic books published by Marvel Comics.

It may more specifically refer to:

Comic book teams
 Guardians of the Galaxy (1969 team), the original 31st-century team from an alternate timeline
 Guardians of the Galaxy (2008 team), the modern version of the team formed in the aftermath of Annihilation: Conquest
 Guardians of the Galaxy (New Guard), consisting of Kitty Pryde, Thing, Drax, Venom, Rocket Raccoon, Groot, and later Star-Lord and Gamora

Media
 Guardians of the Galaxy (film), the 2014 film based on the 2008 comic book version
 Guardians of the Galaxy (Marvel Cinematic Universe), the team in the Marvel Cinematic Universe
 Guardians of the Galaxy (soundtrack), the soundtrack for the film
 Guardians of the Galaxy (TV series), an animated series inspired by the film
 Guardians of the Galaxy Vol. 2, the 2017 sequel to the 2014 film
 Guardians of the Galaxy Vol. 2 (soundtrack), the soundtrack for the film
 Guardians of the Galaxy: The Telltale Series, an episodic video game series, developed by Telltale Games
 Guardians of the Galaxy (video game) (2021)
 The Guardians of the Galaxy Holiday Special (2022)
 Guardians of the Galaxy Vol. 3 (2023)

Other uses
 Guardians of the Galaxy – Mission: Breakout, drop tower theme park attraction at Disney California Adventure
 Guardians of the Galaxy: Cosmic Rewind, an enclosed, backwards-launch roller coaster at Epcot

See also
 List of Guardians of the Galaxy members
 Guardians of the Universe, an unrelated race from DC Comics